Matías Alemanno (born 5 December 1991) is an Argentine rugby union player who plays as a lock for Gloucester in Premiership Rugby, and the Argentina national rugby union team.

Alemmano was a member of the Argentina Under-20 sides which competed in the 2010 and 2011 IRB Junior World Championships and later went on to play for Argentina's representative teams, the Jaguars and the Pampas XV.   He was a member of the Pampas XV squad for the 2013 Vodacom Cup in South Africa and he also went on their tour of Australia in 2014.

He also played in the victory over  a week later and played in all of his country's 3 matches during the 2014 mid-year rugby union internationals series.

In August 2014, he was named in the squad for the 2014 Rugby Championship.

Alemanno was signed to play for  until 2020 after which he moved to England to join Gloucester.

Alemanno was a starter for the  national team on 14 November 2020 in their first ever win against the All Blacks.

References

External links
Its Rugby Profile

1991 births
Living people
Argentine people of Italian descent
Sportspeople from Córdoba, Argentina
Rugby union locks
Pampas XV players
Jaguares (Super Rugby) players
Argentine rugby union players
Argentina international rugby union players